The 2014–15 Nemzeti Bajnokság I, also known as NB I, was the 113th season of top-tier football in Hungary. The league is officially named OTP Bank Liga for sponsorship reasons. The season began 26 July 2014 and concluded on 1 June 2015. Debrecen are the defending champions having won their seventh Hungarian championship last season.

For the first time at a Nemzeti Bajnokság I seasons, match officials used vanishing foam for free kicks. In the Groupama Aréna (FTC) the goal-line technology was used.

Videoton won the league for the second time.

Teams
Mezőkövesd and Kaposvár finished the 2013–14 season in the last two places and thus were relegated to their respective NB II divisions.

The two relegated teams were replaced with the champions and the runners-up 2013–14 NB II Nyíregyháza and Dunaújváros. Each of the first two teams in the first division.

Stadium and locations

Following is the list of clubs competing in 2014–15 Nemzeti Bajnokság I, with their location, stadium and stadium capacity.

Personnel and kits
Following is the list of clubs competing in 2014–15 Nemzeti Bajnokság I, with their manager, captain, kit manufacturer and shirt sponsor.

Note: Flags indicate national team as has been defined under FIFA eligibility rules. Players and Managers may hold more than one non-FIFA nationality.

Managerial changes

League table

Positions by round

Results

Top goalscorers

Updated to games played on 31 May 2015

Hat-tricks

 Four goals

Best players

Hivatásos Labdarúgók Szervezete (Professional Footballers Association) chose the best players of this season.

The best outfielder player (Albert Flórián's challenge cup): Zoltán Gera (FTC)
The best goalkeeper (Zsiborás Gábor's challenge cup): Dénes Dibusz (FTC)
The best player under-21: Dávid Márkvárt (Pécs)
The best manager: Joan Carrillo (Videoton FC)
The best referee: Viktor Kassai

After the season Magyar Labdarúgó Szövetség chose the best players of this season.

The best player: Nemanja Nikolić (Videoton FC)
The best discovered player of this season: Miklós Kitl (Kecskemét)
The best manager: Joan Carrillo (Videoton FC)
The best referee: Péter Solymosi
Fair Play: MTK Budapest FC
The best Hungarian player (Audience Award): Ádám Bódi (DVSC)
The most aesthetically significant, or "most beautiful", goal of NB1 (Audience Award): József Varga (DVSC)

References

External links
  

Nemzeti Bajnokság I seasons
1
Hungary